859 Bouzaréah, provisional designation 1916 c, is a dark asteroid from the asteroid belt about 74 kilometers in diameter. It was discovered by French astronomer Frédéric Sy at the Algiers Observatory in Algeria, North Africa, on 2 October 1916.

The asteroid orbits the Sun at a distance of 2.9–3.6 AU about once every 6 years (2,117 days) and rotates around its axis in 23 hours. Its low geometric albedo of 0.047 has been measured by the Infrared Astronomical Satellite, IRAS.

The asteroid was named after Bouzaréah, location of the discovering observatory and suburb of the Algerian capital, Algiers. Its designation, 1916 c, is a superseded version of the modern two-letter code system of provisional designation, implemented just a few years later in 1925.

References

External links 
 Dictionary of Minor Planet Names, Google books
 
 

000859
Discoveries by Frédéric Sy
Named minor planets
19161002